This is a list of animated feature films released in 2022.

Highest-grossing animated films
The following is a list of the 10 highest-grossing animated feature films first released in 2022.

The Despicable Me and Shrek franchises became the first and most profitable animated film franchises to gross more than $4 billion with the release of Minions: The Rise of Gru and Puss in Boots: The Last Wish.
Minions: The Rise of Gru is the fifth-highest-grossing film of 2022 with a worldwide total of $940.4 million, as well as the highest grossing animated film released during the COVID-19 pandemic, surpassing the 2020 film Demon Slayer: Kimetsu no Yaiba – The Movie: Mugen Train.
2022 is the first year since 2020 to have an animated film gross over $500 million and the first year since 2019 to have a animated film to gross over $600, $700, $800 and $900 million.

References

2022
 Feature films
Lists of 2022 films